Rob & Fab was a short-lived dance-pop music duo formed and fronted by Rob Pilatus and Fab Morvan in 1990, following their departure from the commercially successful but ill-fated group Milli Vanilli.

Career
In the wake of the Milli Vanilli lip-synching scandal, Pilatus and Morvan went to the  studio and recorded a song, "Don't Give Up the Fight", to prove that they could sing. Even though they performed it on multiple TV shows, they never officially released it. Both Pilatus and Morvan then moved to Los Angeles and acquired a new manager, Sandy Gallin. They signed with The Joss Entertainment Group, with whom they recorded new songs featuring their own vocals.

Their first and only album, Rob & Fab, was financed by Joss subsidiary Taj Records in 1992 and released under the Joss Entertainment label in 1993. A single, "We Can Get It On", was made available for radio play to promote the album and was eventually performed on The Arsenio Hall Show, but it was not commercially successful. Additionally, due to financial constraints and subsequent lack of promotion, the album was distributed only in the United States, the market that had become the most critical of Milli Vanilli. "We Can Get It On" failed to chart. The album only sold 2,000 copies.

Over the next two years, the relationship between Pilatus and Morvan soured; the pair eventually stopped speaking to each other. Taj Records went out of business shortly thereafter. Rob & Fab would be the final work by Pilatus prior to his death in 1998. A Milli Vanilli comeback album featuring Pilatus and Morvan, Back and in Attack, was recorded in 1997 but remains unreleased. 

Morvan pursued a solo career, releasing his first album, Love Revolution, in 2003.

Rob & Fab (album)

Track listing

References

1990 establishments in West Germany
1993 disestablishments in Germany
Milli Vanilli
German musical duos
Musical groups established in 1990
Musical groups disestablished in 1993